(Singers association), WAB 82, is a patriotic song, which Anton Bruckner composed in 1882.

History 
Bruckner composed the song on a text of an unknown author, possibly Heinrich von der Mattig, on 3 February 1882. He dedicated it to August Göllerich senior.

With Buckner's agreement, Karl Kerschbaum, the secretary of the Liedertafel Frohsinn, put another, more generalised text on the score to increase the chance of performances. The piece was first performed by Frohsinn in Wels during the fifth  (feast of the singers associations from Upper Austria and Salzburg) on 10 June 1883.

The song was a favourite of the Liedertafel Frohsinn, which performed it again in Passau in September 1890. As homage to their honorary chairman, Frohsinn performed the song on 4 September 1894 for celebrating Bruckner's 70th birthday.

The piece, of which the original manuscript is stored in the archive of the Liedertafel Frohsinn, was published first in 1911 by Viktor Keldorfer (Universal Edition) with Kerschbaum's text.

Lyrics
The original manuscript of Sängerbund was using lyrics of an unknown author, possibly Heinrich von der Mattig. The song was later edited with a revised lyrics by Karl Kerschbaum:

Music 
The 79-bar long work in C major is scored for  choir.

The first strophe begins as a fanfare and evolves via a series of sixth chords to the ending tonic chord. The second strophe begins similarly and evolves from A major via a sixth chord of F minor to the same end as the first strophe.

Discography 

Sängerbund (with Karl Kerschbaum's text) was recorded three times by Attila Nagy with the Universitätssängerschaft 'Barden zu Wien''' in 1996 (100th anniversary of Bruckner's death):
 on 18 May 1996: Anton Bruckner und seine Zeit – CD: disc-lazarus DL-USB 8B
 on 7 June 1996: Bruckner-Festabend anlässlich des 100. Todestages von Ehrenmitglied Anton Bruckner – CD: disc-lazarus DL-USB 8C
 on 26 October 1996: Konzert im Brucknerjahr – CD: disc-lazarus DL-USB 8D

 References 

 Sources 

 Anton Bruckner – Sämtliche Werke, Band XXIII/2:  Weltliche Chorwerke (1843–1893), Musikwissenschaftlicher Verlag der Internationalen Bruckner-Gesellschaft, Angela Pachovsky and Anton Reinthaler (Editor), Vienna, 1989
 Cornelis van Zwol, Anton Bruckner 1824–1896 – Leven en werken, uitg. Thoth, Bussum, Netherlands, 2012. 
 Uwe Harten, Anton Bruckner. Ein Handbuch''. , Salzburg, 1996. .

External links 
 
 Sängerbund C-Dur, WAB 82 – Critical discography by Hans Roelofs 

Weltliche Chorwerke by Anton Bruckner
1882 compositions
Compositions in C major
German patriotic songs